Muriel Freda McKay (4 February 1914 – c. 1 January 1970) was an Australian woman who was kidnapped on 29 December 1969  in the United Kingdom, and presumed murdered in the first few days of 1970. She was married to Alick McKay, an executive at News Limited and deputy to Rupert Murdoch. She was kidnapped after being mistaken for Murdoch's then-wife, Anna Murdoch. Two Indo-Trinidadian brothers, Arthur and Nizamodeen Hosein, were convicted of McKay's murder and kidnapping in September 1970.

The case was one of the earliest examples in the United Kingdom of a trial and conviction in a murder without a body case.

Disappearance
Muriel McKay and her husband Alick were both born and raised in Adelaide, South Australia. After moving to London for her husband's job as a newspaper executive for Rupert Murdoch's News Limited, they lived in St Mary's House on Arthur Road in Wimbledon, London into which they had moved in 1958 on their arrival in England. Their three adult children, Jennifer, Diane and Ian, also lived in the United Kingdom.

On 29 December 1969, assailants broke into the home and abducted Muriel McKay while her husband was at work. Returning home at 7:45 pm and finding the front door unlocked, the telephone ripped from the wall, the contents of his wife's handbag scattered on the stairs, and the house empty, Alick McKay reported her missing at 8pm. The attack was especially troubling given that jewellery had been stolen in a burglary incident three months earlier, and Muriel McKay had become increasingly careful of her personal safety.

Investigation 
When police arrived, the burglary case was quickly upgraded to a kidnapping after investigators found items that were foreign to the house: Elastoplast, twine, a newspaper, and a billhook. After the phone was repaired, at 1am, a caller identifying himself as 'M3' (short for Mafia 3) contacted the house and demanded a £1 million ransom. Over the next forty days, M3 made eighteen more calls, demanding to speak to either Alick or their children Ian and Diane, and sent three letters (postmarked in Tottenham or Wood Green) demanding the money while repeatedly threatening to kill McKay. Five letters written by McKay and pleading for compliance were enclosed as 'proof' that she was alive, as were three pieces cut from her clothing.

Two successive attempts to deliver half of the random money were unsuccessful. The first one, on the A10 on 1 February 1970, was abandoned due to a large police presence in the area. A second attempt was then made on 6 February 1970. The Hosein brothers had specifically asked for McKay's daughter Diane Dyer to make the second drop off as she was always at the forefront of communication. However, following M3's detailed instructions, two disguised police officers placed the ransom (instead of Diane) consisting of £500,000 (primarily composed of fake banknotes) in two suitcases and left them at a telephone box in Church Street in Tottenham where they would receive further instructions. At 4:00pm, M3 rang and instructed to take the ransom money to a second phone box in Bethnal Green, at Bethnal Green, M3 rang again and instructed the officers to take the tube to Epping where they were to take the money to another phone box. Upon the arrival to the phone box in Epping, M3 rang and instructed the officers to take a taxi to a used car yard with a garage in Bishop's Stortford called Gate's Garage where they were instructed to leave the cases next to a minivan that would be parked there on the garage forecourt.

The police conducted surveillance in the area and noticed that a blue Volvo sedan with a broken tail-light, bearing registration XGO 994G, and with a single occupant, slowly passed the garage four times between 8 pm and 10.30 pm. At 10.47 pm it passed again, this time carrying two men. However, a local couple noticed the suitcases and became concerned. The woman kept watching while her husband reported the cases to the police, who were unaware of the drop-off and took them to the local station.

The investigation then shifted to the Volvo, registered in the name of a man from Rooks Farm (now known as Stocking Farm owned by De Burgh-Marsh family) near Stocking Pelham, Hertfordshire .  Reviewing previous reports, they noted that some witnesses had also described seeing a dark coloured Volvo sedan driving near Arthur Road in the hours before McKay's disappearance was reported, and another one reporting it as parked in the McKay driveway around 6 pm. Police also noted it acting suspiciously at the first drop-off attempt but had assumed it was either undercover police or a local. Rooks Farm, which covered eleven acres and was considerably run down, was then raided by police on 7 February at 8 am. The owners of the farm were Trinidad-born Arthur Hosein and his German wife, who also lived with Arthur's youngest sibling, Nizamodeen, who had worked there as a labourer since August. A notebook was found inside with torn pages that matched the tear patterns in McKay's letters. Further, twine and a matching roll of tape were found, and the billhook was revealed as belonging to a neighbour. The brothers' physical descriptions matched those of the men seen in the Volvo, and Arthur's fingerprints also matched those found in the ransom letters and a newspaper found in the McKay house. Similarly, Nizamodeen's voice matched that of recordings of M3 when he was tested on a telephone. However, no trace of McKay was found at the farm, even after it was searched for several weeks.

Trial 
Based on the evidence, the Hosein brothers were arrested and sent to trial on 14 September 1970, with the prosecution led by Peter Rawlinson. At the trial it was learned that Arthur, a tailor in Hackney, was experiencing financial difficulty after buying the farm in May 1968. The farm, originally established in the 17th century, was used to raise cattle, pigs and chickens. The Hoseins decided to kidnap Anna Murdoch after watching her husband being interviewed on television by David Frost about his recent purchase of the News of the World and The Sun newspapers on 30 October. The confusion arose when the Hoseins followed Rupert Murdoch's chauffeured Rolls-Royce to the house in Arthur Road, which they assumed to be his family's residence, but it was actually the McKays. Unbeknownst to the brothers, Murdoch had loaned the car to Alick McKay for a few weeks while he and his wife were in Australia.

Throughout the case, each brother tried to put the blame on the other, although it was soon determined that the older brother was the dominant one. The Hosein brothers were charged with murder, kidnap and blackmail, and convicted at the Old Bailey on 6 October 1970. When imposing life sentences on the pair, plus twenty-five years in Arthur's case, and fifteen in Nizamodeen's, for kidnapping, the trial judge, Justice Shaw, said their "conduct was cold-blooded and abominable". Despite investigation, it was never established what happened to McKay's remains, though there was speculation that the Hoseins had fed them to their guard dogs or pigs.

Aftermath
The Hosein brothers were sent to Winson Green Prison where they appealed their sentence in March 1971. In November 1987 and September 1994, Arthur unsuccessfully applied for parole. Arthur died in 2009 in prison, whereas Nizamodeen served twenty years and was deported to Trinidad after his release.

The nature of the case led to widespread media coverage, along with numerous hoaxes, prank letters, and phone calls to the McKay home. Psychic Gerard Croiset, who had participated in a number of famous missing person investigations, also became involved. Because of the notoriety of the case, likenesses of the brothers were displayed in the Chamber of Horrors in Madame Tussauds, alongside that of then-living murderers Donald Neilson and Graham Young.

In 2017, Kelvin MacKenzie's review of Ink, a play about the history of Murdoch's British tabloid The Sun, described the portion of the play about McKay's kidnapping as its "most dramatic moment". Jane Martinson, in her review for The Guardian, described that portion of the play as its "most uncomfortable moment". She quoted the opinion of playwright James Graham about how to "ethically and morally report on these difficult stories", such as McKay's kidnapping and murder.

In 2021 it was reported that Nizamodeen had told a QC that Muriel McKay died of a heart attack shortly after the kidnapping and provided details of the location of the body at Rooks Farm.

See also
List of kidnappings
List of solved missing person cases

References

External links 
The McKay Kidnapping (1992) – Great Crimes & Trials – YouTube

1970 in England
1970 murders in the United Kingdom
Australian people murdered abroad
January 1970 events in the United Kingdom
Kidnappings in England
Murder in England
Violence against women in England
Female murder victims